The Omaha Fire Department Hose Company building is a historic building located at 999 North 16th Street in Omaha, Nebraska, United States. The former home of Omaha Fire Department's hose company number 4 and designed by German-born architect Joseph P. Guth and built in 1913 by Dutchman Peter Kiewit & Sons, the building is now unoccupied. Charles A. Salter was the chief of the fire department at the time.

In 2011, the Nebraska State Historical Society included the building in its Reconnaissance Survey of Downtown and Columbus Park Omaha, which was prepared for the City of Omaha.

The building has served as the home of horse-drawn fire wagons, a plumbing company, an auto transmission shop, an armored car garage and, its last known use, for storage.

See also
 History of Omaha, Nebraska

References

Fire stations completed in 1913
Buildings and structures in Omaha, Nebraska
Defunct fire stations in Nebraska
1913 establishments in Nebraska
Landmarks in North Omaha, Nebraska